This event was held on Saturday January 26, 2008 as part of the 2008 UCI Cyclo-cross World Championships in Treviso, Italy.

Niels Albert was the big favorite to win and on the first lap he drew away from the rest of the pack, where he remained, finishing more than half a minute in front of the number two.  Duval pulled away from the pack, while Cominelli outsprinted Lopez to take the bronze.

Ranking

Fastest laps

Notes

External links
 Union Cycliste Internationale

Men's under-23 race
UCI Cyclo-cross World Championships – Men's under-23 race
2008 in cyclo-cross